Rafz is a railway station in the Swiss canton of Zürich and municipality of Rafz. The station is located on the Eglisau to Neuhausen line of the Swiss Federal Railway (SBB) that crosses the international border twice on its route between the Swiss cantons of Zürich and Schaffhausen. The station is operated by the SBB and is served by Zurich S-Bahn line S9 that provides a half-hourly service between Zürich and Rafz, with alternate trains continuing to Schaffhausen. Before the timetable revision in late 2015, the station was served by S-Bahn line S5 from Zurich, and an intermediate stop on the S22 between Bülach and Schaffhausen, which was curtailed from Bülach to Jestetten, in turn it no longer fell under the purview of the ZVV.

Customs
Customs checks may be performed aboard trains and in Rafz station by Swiss officials. Systematic passport controls were abolished when Switzerland joined the Schengen Area in 2008.

Rafz train crash
On 20 February 2015, there was a collision between two trains at the station. The crash occurred at approximately 6.43 am. An S-Bahn and an Interregio express train collided.

The collision occurred as the Interregio train, which was running late, was passing through Ratz without stopping. The express was partially derailed, but the couplings held and no carriages overturned. The S-Bahn train was operated by Class 514 electric multiple unit 514 046-2. The InterRegio train was hauled by Class 460 electric locomotive No. 460 087-0.

The 49-year-old driver of the express was seriously injured. He was airlifted to hospital by helicopter. There were five other injuries requiring hospital treatment.

The Swiss Transportation Safety Investigation Board opened an investigation into the accident.

References

External links
Rafz station on Swiss Federal Railway's web site

Rafz
Rafz
Rafz